Hans Eder may refer to:

 Hans Eder (Transylvanian Saxon artist) (1883–1955), painter and graphic artist
 Hans Eder (skier) (1927–2008), Austrian Nordic skier who competed during the 1950s
 Hans Eder (footballer) (1934–2022), German football player and manager